Peludo or El Peludo may refer to:

 Peludos, a group of boys in the television series TV Colosso
 El Peludo, a character created by Argentine animation director and cartoonist Quirino Cristiani
 Hipólito Yrigoyen, the political leader that Cristiani satirized as El Peludo
 Peludópolis, a film directed by Cristiani
 El Peludo, the nickname of Mexican outlaw and folk hero Augustine Chacon
 El Peludo, a character from the Mexican telenovela Rosario Tijeras
 El Peludo, a character from the Colombian film Sumas y restas
 Kaloplocamus peludo, a type of sea slug 
 tatu peludo, Portuguese name for the six-banded armadillo

See also
 Rancho Peludo, a prehistoric art style in Venezuela
 Cerro de los Peludos, a hill in Rivera Department in Uruguay